Cyanopepla scintillans is a moth of the subfamily Arctiinae. It was described by Arthur Gardiner Butler in 1872. It is found in Costa Rica and Panama.

References

Cyanopepla
Moths described in 1872